The National League North, formerly Conference North, is a division of the National League in England, immediately below the National League division. Along with the National League South, it is at the second level of the National League System, and at the sixth tier overall of the English football league system. It consists of teams located in Northern England, Norfolk and the English Midlands. Since the start of the 2015–16 season, the league has been known as the National League North (Vanarama National League North for sponsorship reasons).

The longest tenured team currently competing in the National League North is Gloucester City, having been in the National League North since the 2009–10 season.

History
The Conference North was introduced in 2004 as part of a major restructuring of English non-League football. The champions are automatically promoted to the National League. A second promotion place goes to the winners of play-offs involving the teams finishing in second to seventh place (expanded from four to six teams in the 2017–18 season). The three bottom clubs are relegated to Step 3 leagues. Teams from this division, as well as from the National League South, enter the FA Cup at the Second Qualifying Round.

For sponsorship reasons, the division was known as the Nationwide North from its formation in 2004 until 2007, when it was renamed the Blue Square North. In 2010 it was renamed the Blue Square Bet North. When the Blue Square sponsorship ended in 2013, it was renamed the Skrill North until the 2014–15 season, when it was renamed the Vanarama North. A further name change followed in 2015, when the division was renamed the Vanarama National League North.

The National League North was scheduled to expand to 24 teams in 2021. Due to the COVID-19 pandemic in England, the 2020–21 National League North season was curtailed and voided after written resolutions were put to a vote. No teams were relegated. Expansion would be at last implemented before the 2022–23 season when the bottom club was relegated and four promoted from Step 3.

Member clubs for 2022–23
The member clubs for the 2022–23 season are as follows:

League champions

The winners of the league title and the winners of the play-off final since the league's formation in 2004 are as follows:

League stadiums for 2022–23
The home stadiums for all of the teams in the league for the 2022–23 season are listed below:

League records

See also
National League
National League South

References

External links
 The National League official site

6
2
2004 establishments in England
Sports leagues established in 2004
Northern England
Eng